The Sioule is a  long river in central France, a left tributary of the river Allier. Its source is near the village of Orcival, north of Mont-Dore, in the Massif Central. The Sioule has cut a deep gorge, especially in its upper course. The Sioule flows generally northeast through the following departments and towns:

 Puy-de-Dôme: Pontgibaud
 Allier: Ébreuil, Saint-Pourçain-sur-Sioule

The Sioule flows into the river Allier at La Ferté-Hauterive, 10 km (6 mi) north of Saint-Pourçain-sur-Sioule.

Its main tributaries are the Sioulet and the Bouble.

The Fades viaduct, the tallest railway bridge in France, is located on the Sioule.

References

Rivers of France
Rivers of Auvergne-Rhône-Alpes
Rivers of Allier
Rivers of Puy-de-Dôme